is a Japanese football player for Blaublitz Akita.

Career
Saito joined J3 League club Fukushima United FC in 2015. On 8 November 2015, he netted a hat-trick, the first of his career, in a 3–0 win over J.League U-22 Selection.  In 2016, he moved to J2 League club Roasso Kumamoto. He is one of the fastest players in Japan as he is able to reach speeds of 36 km/h.

Club statistics
''Updated 2 December 2022.

Honours
 Blaublitz Akita
 J3 League (1): 2020

References

External links
Profile at Mito HollyHock

Profile at Roasso Kumamoto
Profile at Fukushima United
Profile at Akita

1993 births
Living people
Sendai University alumni
Association football people from Miyagi Prefecture
Japanese footballers
J2 League players
J3 League players
Blaublitz Akita players
Fukushima United FC players
Roasso Kumamoto players
Mito HollyHock players
AC Nagano Parceiro players
Association football forwards